Yo-kai Watch Jam: Yo-kai Academy Y – Waiwai Gakuen Seikatsu is a 2020 role-playing game developed and published by Level-5 for the Nintendo Switch and PlayStation 4. A spin-off installment in the Yo-kai Watch series, Yo-kai Watch Jam sees the player as Jinpei Jiba, a student at the fictitious Y Academy, who investigates mysteries occurring in the academy and surrounding areas.

Yo-kai Watch Jam was received positively by critics, who praised the game's combat system and environment and school life mode, due to its routine feeling and open world-like style.

Gameplay 

A role-playing game, Yo-kai Watch Jam sees the player as Jinpei Jiba, who aims to become the most popular kid at the Y Academy, an elite boarding school that's also the main setting of the Yo-kai Academy Y anime series. Yo-kai Watch Jam main gameplay occurs during "school life", which is when the player is at the Y Academy and attempts to raise their popularity. Popularity is risen by receiving "Likes", which can be obtained through solving fellow students' quests. During school life, players can also befriend other students and join clubs.

Similarly to previous Yo-kai Watch games, Yo-kai Watch Jam has a combat system, although it has been drastically changed from mainline Yo-kai Watch games, with battles happening in real-time. During battles, players can transform into a Yo-kai Hero using their YSP Watch, which makes the player stronger.

Development and release 
Yo-kai Watch Jam was developed and published by Level-5, who had developed and published most other Yo-kai Watch games. The game is based on the Yo-kai Watch Jam: Yo-kai Academy Y: Encounter with N anime series, which's first season was ongoing at the time of the game's release. Development of Yo-kai Watch Jam was prioritized over Inazuma Eleven: Victory Road, due to Level-5 wanting Victory Road to be "a hit".

The game was first revealed by Level-5 CEO Akihiro Hino on Twitter in December 2019, with an official announcement later being made in the March 2020 issue of CoroCoro Comic. Further details were unveiled during the lead-up towards the game's release. A demo for the game was released on the Nintendo eShop on August 3, 2020.

Yo-kai Watch Jam released on August 13, 2020, on the Nintendo Switch, with a PlayStation 4 release following on October 29. The game was released physically on December 17.

Reception and sales 

Yo-kai Watch Jam received generally favorable reviews from critics, who praised the game's combat and school mode. Akiru Miyashita, writing for 4Gamer.net, stated that Yo-kai Watch Jam was his favorite entry in the Yo-kai Watch series, due to the game's open world-like environment and combat system, which Miyashita opined had a "good tempo".

The game's school environment was received positively by critics. Namco Kushida of Famitsu described it as a "miniature garden", writing that she could "not help but patrol every corner". Totsuka expressed that going to and from school felt routine. Miyashita also enjoyed the routine feeling of school life, calling it "comfortable".

The combat system was also received positively. Keiichi Totsuka of Famitsu wrote that the combat system made it easier for newcomers of the Yo-kai Watch series to get into the game, comparing the system to that of the Yo-kai Watch Blasters series. Gigolo Ashida, writing for Famitsu, appreciated the Yo-kai Hero mechanic, due to it being a "good accent". Amemiya, also of Famitsu, criticized how the game uses a chibi art style during battles, as he felt it makes it harder to see what's happening.

Yo-kai Watch Jam sold over 3 thousand copies on the Nintendo Switch in its first three days of release, making it the 25th best-selling video game in the week of August 10. In late December 2020, Yo-kai Watch Jam was announced to have sold over 42 thousand copies on the Nintendo Switch.

Notes

References

External links 
 

2020 video games
Japan-exclusive video games
Nintendo Switch games
PlayStation 4 games
Role-playing video games
Multiplayer and single-player video games
Video games developed in Japan
Video games scored by Tomohito Nishiura
Yo-kai Watch video games
Level-5 (company) games